Spencerport is a village in Monroe County, New York, United States, and a suburb of Rochester. The population count was 3,601 at the 2010 census.

The Village of Spencerport is within the Town of Ogden and is a village on the Erie Canal.

Spencerport Airpark (D91) is a grass strip general aviation airport south of the village.

Geography
Spencerport is located at  (43.189312, -77.804132).

Demographics

As of the census of 2000, there were 3,559 people, 1,413 households, and 1,001 families residing in the village. The population density was 2,609.7 people per square mile (1,010.4/km2). There were 1,453 housing units at an average density of 1,065.4 per square mile (412.5/km2). The racial makeup of the village was 97.53% White, 0.56% African American, 0.31% Native American, 0.51% Asian, 0.25% from other races, and 0.84% from two or more races. Hispanic or Latino of any race were 1.88% of the population.

There were 1,413 households, out of which 33.7% had children under the age of 18 living with them, 57.0% were married couples living together, 11.2% had a female householder with no husband present, and 29.1% were non-families. 24.1% of all households were made up of individuals, and 8.4% had someone living alone who was 65 years of age or older. The average household size was 2.49 and the average family size was 2.97.

In the village, the population was spread out, with 24.4% under the age of 18, 8.1% from 18 to 24, 28.5% from 25 to 44, 26.0% from 45 to 64, and 13.0% who were 65 years of age or older. The median age was 38 years. For every 100 females, there were 91.3 males. For every 100 females age 18 and over, there were 86.9 males.

The median income for a household in the village was $56,850, and the median income for a family was $62,326. Males had a median income of $44,167 versus $29,722 for females. The per capita income for the village was $24,515. About 0.8% of families and 1.5% of the population were below the poverty line, including none of those under age 18 and 5.6% of those age 65 or over.

History

When the Erie Canal opened, the farm, through which the canal passed at the Canawaugus Road, was sold to become the first village lots. As a port on the canal, the area was called Spencer's Basin and later changed to Spencerport.

On April 22, 1867 the New York State Legislature incorporated Spencerport as a Village and William Slayton was elected as its first mayor.

The Spencerport Methodist Church was listed on the National Register of Historic Places in 2008.

Sites of interest
Erie Canal
Pineway Ponds Park - home to a large playground and multi-use recreation facility
Springdale Farm - an agricultural education facility open to the public, serves as a day program site for adults with developmental disabilities
Colby-Pulver House Museum
Spencerport Depot and Canal Museum- a local history museum and visitors center, located in a restored, former RLBRR trolley station

Notable peoples
Danielle Downey, LPGA golfer: went to school in Spencerport
Shane Prince, NHL Professional Hockey Player, New York Islanders #11
Rick Suhr, Olympic Pole Vault coach 2008, 2012
Maynard Troyer, NASCAR driver: 1971, 1973
Tom Villard (November 19, 1953 – November 14, 1994), American actor known for his leading role in the 1980s series We Got It Made as well as roles in feature films One Crazy Summer, Heartbreak Ridge, and My Girl
Alan Zemaitis, NFL cornerback: went to school in Spencerport

See also
Spencerport Central School District
Spencerport High School
Monroe County, New York
Rochester, New York

Notes

References

External links

Village of Spencerport website

Villages in New York (state)
Rochester metropolitan area, New York
Erie Canal
Villages in Monroe County, New York